Kaywan Sport Club, is an Iraqi football team based in Kirkuk, that plays in Iraq Division Three.

History
Kaywan is one of the active clubs in Kirkuk. It was founded in 1994 by a group of deported Kirkuk athletes in Erbil. After the invasion of Iraq, these athletes returned to their city and transferred the club's activities to it.

Managerial history
 Ezzedine Askar

References

External links
 Iraq Clubs- Foundation Dates

1994 establishments in Iraq
Association football clubs established in 1994
Football clubs in Kirkuk